Weldon Watson (born December 8, 1947) is an American politician who served in the Oklahoma House of Representatives from the 79th district from 2006 to 2018.

References

1947 births
Living people
Republican Party members of the Oklahoma House of Representatives